Kot Nainan is a Town and is union council of Shakargarh Tehsil, District Narowal. It is near the Border Area of Pakistan. It is 249 meters above sea level. The villages near Kot Nainan are Khan Marakka, Kanwal Jatta, Dhariwal, Kot Du'aba, Sogian, Jagyal,Haryal, Kotli Gujjran, Bhagwan Pur Moju'a and Sujowal.

References

Populated places in Narowal District